The Journalism and Media Studies Centre (JMSC) was founded in September 1999 at the University of Hong Kong. The centre is affiliated with the Faculty of Social Sciences in HKU. Educational programmes in JMSC include graduate and undergraduate courses, seminars, workshops and courses for news professionals at all levels of expertise.

Academic programs
Reporting and Writing Program
Media Law Program
China Program
Business and Financial Journalism Program

Faculty
Yuen-Ying Chan Professor and founding director
Keith Richburg Director

China Media Project
China Media Project was established by The University of Hong Kong's Journalism and Media Studies Centre in 2003.

Staff
Ying Chan (陈婉莹)
Director of the Journalism and Media Studies Centre. Before 1998, Professor Ying Chan worked for 23 years as a reporter, editor and documentary filmmaker in New York City.

Professor Chan has also taught at the Columbia Graduate School of Journalism, Columbia University.

Qian Gang
Director, China Media Project, Journalism and Media Studies Centre, The University of Hong Kong.
Qian Gang is also the author of the book Great Earthquake of Tangshan.

David Bandurski (班志远)
Bandurski is a China analyst and freelance investigative journalist at University of Hong Kong and was educated at the Northwestern University. David is responsible for managing the China Media Project website. David Bandurski is a regular contributor in Far Eastern Economic Review, The Wall Street Journal, Index on Censorship, the South China Morning Post and other publications.

Cheng Jinfu (程金福)

Fellows
Mainland China's veteran journalists spend up to three months at the JMSC as Visiting Fellows.

See also
The University of Hong Kong

References

External links
The University of Hong Kong
JMSC
China Media Project
WLCI Media School

University of Hong Kong
1999 establishments in Hong Kong
Educational institutions established in 1999